Sofuoğlu is a surname. Notable people with the surname include:

Surname
Ali Sofuoğlu (born 1995), Turkish karateka
Bahattin Sofuoğlu (1978–2002), Turkish motorcycle racer
Bahattin Sofuoğlu (2003) (born 2003), Turkish professional motorcycle racer
Kenan Sofuoğlu (born 1983), Turkish world champion professional motorcycle racer
Sinan Sofuoğlu (1982–2008), Turkish motorcycle racer
Turan Sofuoğlu (born 1965), Turkish football player

Other uses
Sofuoğlu family, Turkish motorcycle enthusiasts and racers
Sofuoğlu, Yapraklı

Turkish-language surnames